Rahimlui-ye Muran (also Romanized as Raḩīmlūī-ye Mūrān; also known as Raḩīmlū-ye Mūrān) is a village in Azadlu Rural District, Muran District, Germi County, Ardabil Province, Iran. At the 2006 census, its population was 149, in 36 families.

References 

Towns and villages in Germi County